Alberto Bazzoni (San Nicomede di Salsomaggiore (Parma), 1889 – Milan, 1973) was an Italian sculptor.

Biography
After serving in World War I, Bazzoni settled in Parma, where he  attended the Academy of Fine Arts from 1908 to 1913. His public works included a fountain for the barracks in Reggio Emilia and monuments to the fallen in Fidenza and Salsomaggiore. He moved to Milan in 1926 and continued his career as a sculptor there. The influence of his study of Roman sculpture can be seen in the statue of Saint Augustine for Milan Cathedral and the tomb of his wife Bianca in the Cimitero Monumentale. He went to Paris in 1936 and remained there until the outbreak of World War II, producing small bronzes for private collectors. After a second stay in the French capital from 1946 to 1950, he returned to Milan.

References

 Antonella Crippa, Alberto Bazzoni, online catalogue Artgate by Fondazione Cariplo, 2010, CC BY-SA (source for the first revision of this article).

Other projects

1889 births
1973 deaths
Artists from Parma
Italian military personnel of World War I
20th-century Italian sculptors
20th-century Italian male artists
Italian male sculptors
Artists from Milan